Dziennik dla dzieci (Eng: Children's Daily) was the first daily newspaper marketed for children, published in Warsaw from January 2 to December 31, 1830. It was one of several periodicals aimed at children published in the partitioned Poland. It was established and run by Stanisław Jachowicz, a renowned Polish educator, philanthropist, poet, and fabulist. Aimed at children of wealthy families, it developed social and civic education of the youngest generation through articles on festivals, current events, nature, maths, tourism, Polish language etc. as well as through reviews of children's literature. The daily actively engaged its audience by publishing texts submitted by children. It was discontinued after 299 issues.

External links

 Czasopisma dla dzieci i młodzieży - od „Rozrywek dla dzieci” do wybuchu drugiej wojny światowej, Biuletyn EBIB, 9/2006 

Defunct newspapers published in Poland
Publications established in 1830
Publications disestablished in 1830
Newspapers published in Warsaw
1830 establishments in Poland
Polish-language newspapers
Daily newspapers published in Poland